Title 11 of the United States Code, also known as the United States Bankruptcy Code, is the source of bankruptcy law in the United States Code.

Chapters
Title 11 is subdivided into nine chapters. It used to include more chapters, but some of them have since been repealed in their entirety.  The nine chapters are:
Chapter 1: General Provisions
Chapter 3: Case Administration
Chapter 5: Creditors, the Debtor and the Estate
Chapter 7: Liquidation
Chapter 9 : Adjustment of Debts of a Municipality
Chapter 11: Reorganization
Chapter 12: Adjustment of Debts of a Family Farmer or Fisherman with Regular Annual Income
Chapter 13: Adjustment of Debts of an Individual with Regular Income
Chapter 15: Ancillary and Other Cross-Border Cases

References

Further reading

External links
United States Bankruptcy Code via usbankruptcycode.org
U.S. Code Title 11, via United States Government Publishing Office
U.S. Code Title 11, via Cornell University

 
11
 
11 (number)